The 1981 European Athletics Indoor Championships were held in Grenoble, a city in France, between 21–22 February 1981. It was the second time the championships were held in the city. The track used for the championships was 180 metres long.

Medal summary

Men

1 The race was stopped one lap short (at 2820m) due to an official's error.

Women

Medal table

Participating nations

 (8)
 (6)
 (18)
 (10)
 (5)
 (12)
 (10)
 (38)
 (17)
 (5)
 (8)
 (2)
 (21)
 (3)
 (1)
 (10)
 (1)
 (21)
 (12)
 (9)
 (6)
 (26)
 (6)

See also
1981 in athletics (track and field)

References
 Results - men at GBRathletics.com
 Results - women at GBRathletics.com
 EAA

 
European Athletics Indoor Championships
European Indoor Championships
European Athletics Indoor Championships
Sports competitions in Grenoble
International athletics competitions hosted by France
20th century in Grenoble
European Athletics Indoor Championships